Cornel is a given name and occasionally a nickname (a hypocorism or short form of Corneliu). It may refer to:

Given name
 Cornel Buta (born 1977), Romanian footballer
 Cornel Cernea (born 1976), Romanian football goalkeeper
 Cornel Chin-Sue (born 1976), Jamaican footballer
 Cornel Cornea (born 1981), Romanian footballer
 Cornel Damian (born 1960), Romanian Roman Catholic auxiliary bishop
 Cornel Dinu (born 1948), Romanian retired football defender
 Cornel Dobre (born 1975), Romanian footballer
 Cornel Drăgușin (born 1926), Romanian retired football manager
 Cornel Durău (born 1957), Romanian handball player
 Cornel Feruță (born 1975), Romanian diplomat
 Cornel Frăsineanu (born 1976), Romanian footballer
 Cornel Fredericks (born 1990), South African 400 m hurdler
 Cornel Gheorghe (born 1971), Romanian coach and retired figure skater
 Cornel Lengyel (1914–2003), American poet, historian, playwright and translator
 Cornel Lichtenberg (1848–?), Hungarian physician
 Cornel Lucas (1920–2012), British photographer
 Cornel Medrea (1888–1964), Romanian sculptor
 Cornel Patrichi (1944–2016), Romanian ballet dancer, choreographer and actor
 Cornel Pavlovici (1943–2013), Romanian footballer
 Cornel Penu (born 1926), Romanian retired handball player
 Cornel Piper (born 1837), retired Canadian Football League player
 Cornel Popa, various people
 Cornel Predescu (born 1987), Romanian footballer
 Cornel Țălnar (born 1957), Romanian coach and retired footballer
 Cornel Vena (born 1932), Romanian retired pentathlete
 Cornel West (born 1953), American political scholar

Nickname
 Cornel Marin (born 1953), Romanian fencer and two-time Olympic bronze medalist
 Corneliu Oros (born 1950), Romanian retired volleyball player

Masculine given names
Romanian masculine given names
Lists of people by nickname
Hypocorisms